Swim Inside the Moon is the second studio album by American musician Angelo De Augustine, released on Asthmatic Kitty on August 25, 2017.

Track listing

Critical reception

In a positive review, Peter Edwards from The Line of Best Fit said that "(Swim Inside the Moon) is a warning shot, a sign of things to come. This is just the beginning for Angelo De Augustine – an artist full of potential. Simon Ellman of Exclaim wrote that "it's clear this record is intended to be far more relaxing than revolutionary. If hippie-ish comfort is what you seek, take a Swim Inside the Moon".

Personnel
Performance
 Angelo De Augustine – vocals

Technical personnel
 Angelo De Augustine – producer

References 

2017 albums
Angelo De Augustine albums